Tun Dr. Awang bin Hassan (9 November 1910 – 12 September 1998) was a Malaysian politician who served as the 5th Yang di-Pertua Negeri (Governor) of Penang from 1981 until his retirement in 1989. He had previously served as the 7th Malaysian High Commissioner to Australia from 1973 to 1980.

Education
He received his early education at Sekolah Bukit Zahrah in Johor Bahru and later at the English College Johore Bahru. Awang began attendance at the King Edward VII College of Medicine (now the Yong Loo Lin School of Medicine of the National University of Singapore) and graduated with a Licentiate in Medicine and Surgery (LMS) in 1934. He worked as a specialist in Kandang Kerbau Hospital in Singapore before opening his own clinic.

Politics
Awang joined politics and was made Deputy Speaker of Dewan Rakyat and Member of Parliament for Muar Selatan. He was later appointed as the 7th Malaysian High Commissioner to Australia from 1973 to 1980, after which he became the 5th Yang di-Pertua Negeri (Governor) of Penang, Malaysia from 1981 to 1989. Awang also played a part in the formation of United Malays National Organisation together with his brother-in-laws, Suleiman Abdul Rahman and Ismail Abdul Rahman.

Personal life
Tun Awang married Toh Puan Khadijah Abdul Rahman, sister of Tun Dr. Ismail Abdul Rahman, the 2nd Deputy Prime Minister of Malaysia in 1936. They had four sons and three daughters. In 1989, two years after Toh Puan Khadijah's death, Tun Awang married her younger sister-in-law, Toh Puan Dr. Zubaidah Abdul Rahman.

Death
Tun Dr. Awang Hassan died on 12 September 1998 at the age of 87. He was buried at the Mahmoodiah Royal Mausoleum in Johor Bahru.

Honours

Honours of Penang
 As 5th Yang di-Pertua Negeri of Penang ( – )
  Knight Grand Commander (DUPN) with title Dato' Seri Utama
  Grand Master of the Order of the Defender of State

Honours of Malaysia
  :
  Malaysian Commemorative Medal (Silver) (PPM) (1965)
  Grand Commander of the Order of the Defender of the Realm (SMN) – Tun (1982)
  :
  Knight Grand Commander of the Order of the Crown of Johor (SPMJ) – Dato' (1977)

Places named after him
Several projects and institutions were named after him, including:
 Jalan Tun Dr Awang, a major highway in Penang which connects from Sungai Nibong to Bayan Lepas
 Taman Tun Dr Awang, a township in Butterworth, Penang

See also
 Yahya Awang
 Governor of Penang
 Muar

References

1910 births
Malaysian people of Bugis descent
1998 deaths
People from Muar
Malaysian diplomats
People from Johor
Malaysian people of Malay descent
Malaysian Muslims
United Malays National Organisation politicians
Members of the Dewan Rakyat
Yang di-Pertua Negeri of Penang
University of Malaya alumni
High Commissioners of Malaysia to Australia
Grand Commanders of the Order of the Defender of the Realm
Knights Grand Commander of the Order of the Crown of Johor
20th-century Malaysian physicians
Companions of the Order of the Crown of Johor